XEHZ-AM/XHHZ-FM (990 AM/105.5 FM, "Radio HZ") is a Mexican radio station that serves the area around La Paz, Baja California Sur.

History
XEHZ was the first broadcasting station owned by the Aréchiga Espinoza family and the second in all of Baja California Sur. It received its concession on December 4, 1963 and was approved to migrate to FM in 2011.

External links
 Radio Locator information on XEHZ

References

Regional Mexican radio stations
Spanish-language radio stations
Radio stations in La Paz, Baja California Sur